Amitābha, also known as Amitāyus, is the primary Buddha of Pure Land Buddhism. In Vajrayana Buddhism, he is known for his longevity, discernment, pure perception, purification of aggregates, and deep awareness of emptiness. He possesses infinite merit resulting from good deeds over countless past lives as a bodhisattva named Dharmākara.

Doctrine

Attainment of Buddhahood
According to the Larger Sūtra of Immeasurable Life, Amitābha was, in very ancient times and possibly in another system of worlds, a monk named Dharmākara. In some versions of the sūtra, Dharmākara is described as a former king who, having come into contact with Buddhist teachings through the buddha Lokeśvararāja, renounced his throne. These resolutions were expressed in his forty-eight vows, which set out the type of Pureland Dharmākara aspired to create, the conditions under which beings might be born into that world, and what kind of beings they would be when reborn there.

In the versions of the sutra widely known in China, Vietnam, Korea and Japan, Dharmākara's eighteenth vow was that any being in any universe desiring to be reborn into Amitābha's pure land and calling upon his name with sincerity, even as few as ten times will be guaranteed rebirth there. His nineteenth vow promises that he, together with his bodhisattvas and other blessed Buddhists, will appear before those who, at the moment of death, call upon him. This openness and acceptance of all kinds of people has made belief in pure lands one of the major influences in Mahāyāna Buddhism. Pure Land Buddhism seems to have first become popular in Gandhara, from where it spread to China and influenced by Taoists and Confucian philosophy before spreading to Central and East Asia.

The sutra goes on to explain that Amitābha, after accumulating great merit over countless lives, finally achieved buddhahood and created a pure land called Sukhāvatī (Sanskrit: "possessing happiness"). Sukhāvatī is situated in the uttermost west, beyond the bounds of our own world. By the power of his vows, Amitābha has made it possible for all who call upon him to be reborn into this land, there to undergo instruction by him in the dharma and ultimately become bodhisattvas and buddhas in their turn (the ultimate goal of Mahāyāna Buddhism). From there, these same bodhisattvas and buddhas return to our world to help yet more people while still residing in his land of Sukhāvatī, whose many virtues and joys are described.

References in Sutras
The basic doctrines concerning Amitābha and his vows are found in three canonical Mahāyāna texts:
 Amitayurdhyana Sutra
 Longer Sukhāvatīvyūha Sūtra
 Shorter Sukhāvatīvyūha Sūtra

Amitābha is the buddha of comprehensive love. He lives in the West (represented as a meditating Buddha) and works for the enlightenment of all beings (represented as a blessing Buddha). His most important enlightenment technique is the visualization of the surrounding world as a paradise. Those who see his world as a paradise awaken his enlightenment energy. The world can be seen as a paradise by a corresponding positive thought (enlightenment thought) or by sending light to all beings (wish all beings to be happy). After the Amitābha doctrine, one can come to paradise (in the Pure Land of Amitābha), if they visualize at their death Amitābha in the heaven (sun) over their head (western horizon), think his name as a mantra and leave the body as a soul through the crown chakra.

Vajrayāna Buddhism
Amitābha is also known in Tibet, Mongolia, and other regions where Tibetan Buddhism is practiced. His consort is Pāṇḍaravāsinī. His two main disciples (the same number as Gautama Buddha) are the bodhisattvas Vajrapani and Avalokiteśvara, the former to his left and the latter to his right. In Tibetan Buddhism, there exist a number of famous prayers for taking rebirth in Sukhāvatī (Dewachen). One of these was written by Je Tsongkhapa on the request of Manjushri (For a discussion and translation of the most important prayers in the Tibetan tradition see Halkias).

The Panchen Lamas and Shamarpas are considered to be emanations of Amitābha.

He is frequently invoked in Tibet either as Amitābha – especially in the phowa practices or as Amitāyus – especially in practices relating to longevity and preventing an untimely death.

In Shingon Buddhism, Amitābha is seen as one of the thirteen Buddhas to whom practitioners can pay homage. Shingon, like Tibetan Buddhism, also uses special devotional mantras for Amitābha, though the mantras used differ. Amitābha is also one of the Buddhas featured in the Womb Realm Mandala used in Shingon practices, and sits to the west, which is where the Pure Land of Amitābha is said to dwell.

Mantras 
Amitābha is the center of a number of mantras in Vajrayana practices. His mantra in Shingon Buddhism is （Japanese: ）, which represents the underlying Indic form .

In addition to using the mantras listed above, many Buddhist schools invoke Amitābha's name in a practice known as nianfo in Chinese and nembutsu in Japanese.

Names in various languages 

This is a compound of the Sanskrit words amita ("without bound, infinite") and ābhā ("light, splendor"). Consequently, the name is to be interpreted as "he who possesses light without bound, he whose splendor is infinite".

The name Amitāyus (nominative form ) is also used for the Sambhogakāya aspect of Amitābha, particularly associated with longevity. He is mostly depicted sitting and holding in his hands a vessel containing the nectar of immortality. In Tibetan Buddhism, Amitāyus is also one of the three deities of long life (Amitāyus, White Tara and Uṣṇīṣavijayā). Amitāyus being a compound of amita ("infinite") and āyus ("life"), and so means "he whose life is boundless".

In Chinese, pronounced "Ēmítuófó", is the Chinese pronunciation for the Sanskrit name of the Amitābha Buddha (Amida Buddha).  The "e mi tuo" is the transliteration of the Sanskrit word "amita" which means "boundless" ("wuliang").  "Fo" is the Chinese word for "Buddha".

In Vietnamese, Korean, and Japanese, the same Chinese characters used for Amitābha are used to represent his name, though they are pronounced slightly differently:
 Vietnamese: A Di Đà Phật
 Korean: Amita Bul
 Japanese: Amida Butsu.

In addition to transliteration, the name Amitābha has also been translated into Chinese using characters which, taken together, convey the meaning "Infinite Light": 無量光 (Wúliàngguāng). In the same fashion, the name Amitāyus ("Infinite Life") has been translated as 無量壽 (Wúliàngshòu). These translated names are not, however, very commonly used.

In Japanese, Amitābha is also called .

In Tibetan, Amitābha is called   and in its reflex form as Amitāyus,  . They are iconographically distinct.

Iconography 

When in the descending standing position, Amitābha is often shown with left arm bare and extended downward with thumb and forefinger touching, with the right hand facing outward also with thumb and forefinger touching. The meaning of this mudra is that wisdom (symbolized by the raised hand) is accessible to even the lowest beings, while the outstretched hand shows that Amitābha's compassion is directed at the lowest beings, who cannot save themselves.

When not depicted alone, Amitābha is often portrayed with two assistant bodhisattvas, usually Avalokiteśvara on the right and Mahāsthāmaprāpta on the left.  This iconography is known as an Amitabha triad, and is especially common in Japanese and Korean art.

Amitābha is said to display 84,000 auspicious and distinguishing marks reflecting his many virtues.  Amitābha can often be distinguished by his mudrā: Amitābha is often depicted, when shown seated, displaying the meditation mudrā (thumbs touching and fingers together as in the Great Buddha of Kamakura at Kōtoku-in or the exposition mudrā, while the earth-touching mudrā (right hand pointed downward over the right leg, palm inward) is reserved for a seated Gautama Buddha alone. He can also be seen holding a lotus in his hands while displaying the meditation mudrā.

There is a difference between Amitāyus and Amitābha. Amitāyus—the Buddha of Infinite Life—and Amitābha—the Buddha of Infinite Light—are essentially identical, being reflective images of one another. Sutras in which Gautama Buddha expounds the glories of Sukhavati, the Pure Lands, speak of the presiding Buddha sometimes as Amitābha and sometimes as Amitāyus. When depicted as Amitāyus he is depicted in fine clothes and jewels and as Amitābha in simple monk's clothing. They are also simply known as Amida in the Chinese and Japanese tradition. The image of the gold colored statue in the article is of Amitāyus as he is wearing a five-pointed crown, which is the easiest way to distinguish them. Amitāyus is an emanation of Amitābha. Amitābha is the head of the Lotus family.

In Vajrayana, Amitābha is the most ancient of the Dhyani Buddhas. He is of red color originating from the red seed syllable hrīḥ. He represents the cosmic element of "Sanjana" (name). His vehicle is the peacock. He exhibits Samadhi Mudra his two palms folded face up, one on top of the other, lying on his lap. The lotus is his sign. When represented on the stupa, he always faces toward west. He is worshiped thinking that one can have salvation.

Archeological origins 
The first known epigraphic evidence for Amitābha is the bottom part of a statue found in Govindnagar, Pakistan and now located at Government Museum, Mathura. The statue is dated to "the 26th year of the reign of " i.e., sometime in the latter half of the second century during the Kushan Empire, and was apparently dedicated to "Amitābha Buddha" by a family of merchants.

The first known sutra mentioning Amitābha is the translation into Chinese of the Pratyutpanna Samādhi Sūtra by the Kushan monk  around 180. This work is said to be at the origin of pure land practices in China and was integrated with and influenced by the already established Taoist and Confucian principles and practices.

The appearance of such literature and sculptural remains at the end of the second century suggests that the doctrine of Amitābha probably developed during the first and second centuries. Furthermore, there are sculptures of Amitabha in dhyani mudras as well as bronzes of Amitābha in abhaya mudra from the Gandhara era of the first century, suggesting the popularity of Amitābha during that time. One of the last prayer busts of Amitābha can be found in the trademark black stone of the Pala Empire, which was the last Buddhist empire of India and lost its influence in the twelfth century due to Muslim conquests on the Indian subcontinent.

See also
 Chan Buddhism
 Chinese Buddhism
 Jōdo Shinshū
 Neo-Confucianism
 Nianfo
 Pure Land Buddhism
 Shaolin Monastery
 Shinran
 Yuzu Nembutsu

Notes

Bibliography
Karashima, Seishi (2009), On Amitābha, Amitāyu(s), Sukhāvatī and the Amitābhavyūha, Bulletin of the Asia Institute, New Series, 23, 121–130

External links

The Buddha Speaks of Amitabha Sutra (Pure Land)
Shingon Buddhism: Amida Nyorai/Buddha of Infinite light and Life

 
Pure Land Buddhism